Clear Lake Township is one of sixteen townships in Cerro Gordo County, Iowa, USA.  As of the 2000 census, its population was 8,161.

Geography
The city of Clear Lake borders it to the east.

References

External links
 US-Counties.com
 City-Data.com

Townships in Cerro Gordo County, Iowa
Mason City, Iowa micropolitan area
Townships in Iowa